Tillandsia bartramii, commonly known as Bartram's airplant, is a species of flowering plant in the bromeliad family.  It is native to Florida, South Carolina and southern Georgia in the United States as well as Guatemala and Mexico (Tamaulipas, Oaxaca, Guerrero, Jalisco, San Luis Potosí). The name honours William Bartram (1739 – 1823), an early Florida naturalist.

Description
Plants form clumps 20–40 cm (8-16 inches) in diameter. There are 15-30 gray leaves, which measure 15-40 × 0.2-0.5 cm (6-16 × 0.08-0.20 inches).  Inflorescences are 8–15 cm (3.2-6.0 inches) in length, 2–4 mm (0.08-0.16 inches) in diameter, and have 5-20 flowers. Spikes measure 2-4 × 1 cm (0.8-1.6 × 0.4 inches), while floral bracts are 1.4-1.7 cm (0.45-0.68 inches) in length. Fruits measure 2.5–3 cm (1.0-1.2 inches) in diameter.

References

External links

bartramii
Plants described in 1817
Flora of the Southeastern United States
Flora of Mexico
Flora of Guatemala
Flora without expected TNC conservation status